Cours is a commune in the Rhône department and Auvergne-Rhône-Alpes region in eastern France. Cours-la-Ville is the municipal seat.

History 
On 1 January 2016, Cours was created by the merger of Cours-la-Ville, Pont-Trambouze and Thel.

References

Communes of Rhône (department)
Beaujolais (province)